Heinz "Flocke" Flohe (28 January 1948 – 15 June 2013) was a German footballer and manager.

Career 
Flohe played for 1. FC Köln (1966–1979), winning the Bundesliga title in 1978, and the DFB-Pokal in 1968, 1977 and 1978. He also played for TSV 1860 Munich (1979–1980). His career ended after a serious injury in his last match.

He earned 39 caps and scored 8 goals for West Germany. He was in the winning squad for the 1974 FIFA World Cup. He also played in the UEFA Euro 1976 and the 1978 FIFA World Cup.

Personal life 
On 11 May 2010, Flohe lapsed into coma, after a stroke and died on 15 June 2013, aged 65.

Honours

Club 
Köln
 Bundesliga: 1977–78; runner-up: 1972–73
 DFB-Pokal: 1967–68, 1976–77, 1977–78; runner-up: 1969–70, 1970–71, 1972–73

International
Germany
 FIFA World Cup: 1974
 UEFA European Championship: runner-up 1976

References

External links
 
 
 

1948 births
2013 deaths
German footballers
Germany international footballers
Germany B international footballers
Germany under-21 international footballers
1. FC Köln players
TSV 1860 Munich players
1974 FIFA World Cup players
UEFA Euro 1976 players
1978 FIFA World Cup players
FIFA World Cup-winning players
Bundesliga players
People from Euskirchen
Sportspeople from Cologne (region)
Association football midfielders
Footballers from North Rhine-Westphalia
West German footballers
West German football managers
Germany youth international footballers